Johnnie Harris (born November 8, 1966) is the current head coach of the Auburn Tigers women's basketball team. Previously she coached for Arkansas, Texas A&M, Mississippi State, and the University of Texas.

Head coaching record

References 

1966 births
Living people
Arkansas Baptist College alumni
Arkansas Razorbacks women's basketball coaches
Auburn Tigers women's basketball coaches
Little Rock Trojans women's basketball coaches
Mississippi State Bulldogs women's basketball coaches
NC State Wolfpack women's basketball coaches
Sportspeople from Pine Bluff, Arkansas
Texas A&M Aggies women's basketball coaches
Texas Longhorns women's basketball coaches
University of Arkansas at Pine Bluff alumni